"I Like That" is a song by American R&B singer Houston. It is the first single released from his debut album, It's Already Written (2004). The song features Chingy, Nate Dogg, and I-20. Released on May 10, 2004, "I Like That" peaked at number three on the US Billboard Hot R&B/Hip-Hop Songs chart and number 11 on the Billboard Hot 100 and the UK Singles Chart. The song also charted within the top 40 in several other countries, including Australia, France, Italy, New Zealand and Switzerland.

Music video

The official music video for the song was directed by Jeremy Rall.

Track listings

US and Australian CD single
 "I Like That" (album version)
 "I Like That" (extended version)
 "I Like That" (radio edit)
 "I Like That" (instrumental)

US and UK 12-inch single
A1. "I Like That" (album version)
A2. "I Like That" (instrumental)
B1. "I Like That" (extended version)

UK CD single
 "I Like That" (album version)
 "I Like That" (extended version)

French CD single
 "I Like That" (radio edit) – 3:56
 "I Like That" (extended version) – 6:31
 "I Like That" (instrumental) – 3:56

Charts and certifications

Weekly charts

Year-end charts

Certifications

Release history

References

2003 songs
2004 debut singles
Capitol Records singles
Houston (singer) songs
Chingy songs
Nate Dogg songs
I-20 (rapper) songs
Crunk songs
Music videos directed by Jeremy Rall
Song recordings produced by the Trak Starz
Songs written by Chingy
Songs written by Nate Dogg